Inamdar Ketanbhai Mahendrabhai (born August 1, 1978) is an Indian politician.

Career 
He was elected in the Vadodara Jilla Panchayat In 2010 as an independent candidate from Dhantej Jilla panchayat sit.

He is a MLA of Savli assembly constituency. He had contested the seat as an independent after being rejected by the Bharatiya Janata Party during the 2012 assembly polls. Ketanbhai won with a convincing margin and was the only independent to be elected in the state. He got 62,849 votes and Khumansin Raysinh Chauhan of the INC got 42530 votes only.  He had earlier contested the district panchayat polls as an independent and won. But he had later supported the BJP in the district panchayat and joined them again.

On 24 December 2016, he was one of three BJP MLAs, including Manjalpur MLA Yogesh Patel and Sayajigunj MLA Jitendra Sukhadia, to stand with Maharaja Sayajirao University of Baroda professor Dr. I.I. Pandya after he was denied promotion by the university's syndicate group controlled by Ketanbhai's own party.

References 

1978 births
Living people
Gujarat MLAs 2012–2017
People from Vadodara district
Bharatiya Janata Party politicians from Gujarat